51P/Harrington is a periodic comet in the Solar System.

It was discovered by Robert George Harrington at Palomar Observatory on 14 August 1953 using the Schmidt telescope. It then had a brightness of magnitude 15. In October 1956 its orbit was affected by the planet Jupiter and on its next return in 1960 the brightness had fallen to magnitude 20. By 1980 it had slightly improved to magnitude 18. It has a period of 7.1 years.

In 1987 and 1994 brightness had significantly increased to magnitude 12. In 1994 Jim Scotti at Kitt Peak Observatory observed that the comet had broken up and that two detached pieces were accompanying the main body, which explained the improvement in the brightness. By 2001 further splitting had occurred.

51P will come to opposition on 23 August 2022 when it will have a solar elongation of 168 degrees and be 0.74 AU from Earth. It will come to perihelion (closest approach to the Sun) on 3 October 2022.

See also
 List of periodic comets

References
 

  Google Books

External links 
 Orbital simulation from JPL (Java) / Horizons Ephemeris
 51P/Harrington – Seiichi Yoshida @ aerith.net
 Elements and Ephemeris for 51P/Harrington – Minor Planet Center
  51P/Harrington at the Minor Planet Center's Database
 51P/Harrington – Kazuo Kinoshita (2008 Dec. 21)
 51P/Harrington – Gary W. Kronk's Cometography

Periodic comets
0051
Split comets
Comets in 2015
Comets in 2022
19530814